Now is the 12th studio album released by Peter Frampton through 33rd Street Records.

Track listings

Personnel 
 Peter Frampton – guitar, vocals, engineer, mixing, production 
 Bob Mayo – keyboards, guitar, backing vocals 
 John Regan – bass
 Chad Cromwell – drums, percussion 
Additional musicians
 Don Fields – acoustic guitar on (9)
 Gordon Kennedy – guitar on (1, 7, 8), backing vocals on (3, 5, 7, 8, 11)
 Jed Leiber – keyboards on (10) 
 Irene Revels, Lana Dallas, Reggie Calloway – backing vocals on (2)
 Kimmie Rhodes – backing vocals on (6)
 Wayne Kirkpatrick – backing vocals on (11)
 Chris McHugh – tambourine on (11)

References

 Personnel : https://www.discogs.com/fr/Peter-Frampton-Now/release/9765453

2003 albums
Peter Frampton albums
33rd Street Records albums
Albums produced by Peter Frampton